Friendship Bridge may refer to:

Bridges
 Afghanistan–Uzbekistan Friendship Bridge, between Afghanistan and Uzbekistan
 Amizade Bridge (meaning Friendship Bridge), between the Macau Peninsula and Taipa Island
 Malaysia–Thailand Second Friendship Bridge, between Malaysia and Thailand
Friendship Bridge (Shiwei) between Russia and Inner Mongolia at Shiwei, Inner Mongolia and Olochi, Russia over the Argun River.
 Friendship Bridge (Paraguay–Brazil), between Paraguay and Brazil
 Giurgiu-Ruse Friendship Bridge, between Bulgaria and Romania over the Danube
 Korea Russia Friendship Bridge, between Russia and North Korea
 Friendship Bridge (Narva), between Estonia and Russia over the Narva River
 Brunei–Malaysia Friendship Bridge, between Brunei and Malaysia
 Puente La Amistad de Taiwán (meaning Friendship Bridge), built by Taiwan across the Tempisque River in Costa Rica
 Qatar–Bahrain Friendship Bridge, between Qatar and Bahrain (planned for 2022)
 Malaysia–Thailand First Friendship Bridge, between Malaysia and Thailand
 Sino–Korean Friendship Bridge, between China and North Korea
 Sino-Nepal Friendship Bridge, between China and Nepal
 Suez Canal Bridge also known as the Egyptian-Japanese Friendship Bridge
 Tajik-Afghan Friendship Bridge, between Tajikistan and Afghanistan
 Friendship Bridge (Tartu), Tartu, Estonia
 Thai-Japanese Friendship Bridge, built by Japanese loan money in Bangkok, Thailand
 First Thai–Lao Friendship Bridge, between Laos and Thailand at Vientiane/Nongkhai, funded by Australia
 Second Thai-Lao Friendship Bridge, between Laos and Thailand Savannakhet/Mukdahan
 Third Thai-Lao Friendship Bridge, between Nakhon Phanom and Thakhek
 Fourth Thai-Lao Friendship Bridge, between Chiang Khong and Ban Houayxay
 First Thai-Myanmar Friendship Bridge, between Mae Sot and Myawaddy
 Second Thai-Myanmar Friendship Bridge, between Mae Sai and Tachileik
 Thai-Cambodian Friendship Bridge, between Ban Nong Ian and Stung Bot
 Youyi Bridge (meaning Friendship Bridge), built by China in Pakistan
 Friendship Bridge (Germany-France), between Germany and France

Other uses
 Friendship Bridge (non-profit), non-profit organization in the United States

See also 
 Peace Bridge (disambiguation)
 Bering Strait bridge
 Fraternity Bridge, linking Brazil and Argentina
 Unity Bridge across Ruvuma River between Tanzania and Mozambique